The Guest family is a British family that has been prominent in business and politics since the 18th century. It was involved in the British iron and steel industry, particularly the Dowlais Ironworks in Wales, which later became part of Guest, Keen and Nettlefolds. Hereditary titles held by members of the family include Baron Wimborne, Baron Ashby St Ledgers and Viscount Wimborne, all in the Peerage of the United Kingdom.

John Guest
John Guest (1722–1785 or 25 November 1787) was a brewer, farmer and coal merchant in Broseley, Shropshire. He collaborated with Isaac Wilkinson in starting the Plymouth Ironworks in 1763 and there came to the attention of Thomas Lewis and the other Dowlais partners. He moved to Dowlais and was appointed manager of the works on 30 April 1767. He built his first house at Morlais Brook, Gellifaelog, but, isolated from his family, became a "lonely and melancholy man". By 1767, Guest had moved most of his family to Dowlais. His children were:
Thomas Guest (infra); and
Sarah Guest, who married William Taitt (died 1815), another of the Dowlais partners.

Thomas Guest
Thomas Guest (died 1807) continued his father's work at Dowlais. He married Jemima Revel Phillips of Shifnal, Shropshire. They had three daughters and two sons:
Josiah John Guest (infra); and
Thomas Revel Guest (1790–1837), a partner in Dowlais with two shares, and the firm's agent in Ireland. Along with his brother, he was one of the promoters and original shareholders of the Taff Vale Railway. On his death, he left one share to his brother and one to his nephew, Edward John Hutchins.
Thomas Guest did much to modernise production at Dowlais, employing several of his relatives, including Cornelius Guest, Charles Guest and George Guest.

Sir Josiah John Guest, 1st Baronet
Sir Josiah John Guest, 1st Baronet (1785–1852), married:
11 March 1817: Maria Elizabeth Ranken (died January 1818), the third daughter of William Ranken from Ireland.
29 July 1833: Lady Charlotte Elizabeth Bertie (1812–1895), eldest child of Albemarle Bertie, 9th Earl of Lindsey. They had ten children, including:
Ivor Bertie Guest (infra);
Montague Guest; and
Arthur Guest.

Ivor Bertie Guest, 1st Baron Wimborne
Ivor Bertie Guest, 1st Baron Wimborne (1835–1914), married Lady Cornelia Henrietta Maria Spencer-Churchill (1847–1927), daughter of John Spencer-Churchill, 7th Duke of Marlborough, and aunt of Winston Churchill. They had four daughters and five sons:
Frances Charlotte Guest (1869-1957);
Corisande Evelyn Vere Guest (1870-1943);
Elaine Augusta Guest (1871-1958);
Ivor Churchill Guest (1873-1939) (infra);
Christian Henry Charles Guest (1874–1957);
Frederick Edward Guest (1875-1937) (infra);
Rosamund Cornelia Gwladys Guest (1877-1947);
Lionel Guest (1880–1935), was a co-founder of the Ritz-Carlton Montreal. He married Flora Bigelow Dodge, daughter of John Bigelow, in 1905. Flora was the author of Laughter and Tears (1926) and the mother, by her first marriage, of John Bigelow Dodge; and
Oscar Guest (1888–1958).

Ivor Churchill Guest, 1st Viscount Wimborne
Ivor Churchill Guest, 1st Viscount Wimborne (1873–1939), married Alice Katherine Sibell Grosvenor, daughter of Robert Wellesley Grosvenor, 2nd Baron Ebury. They had two daughters, and one son:
Ivor Grosvenor Guest, 2nd Viscount Wimborne.

Frederick Edward Guest
Frederick Edward Guest (1875–1937), married Amy Phipps (1873–1959), daughter of American industrialist Henry Phipps. The couple had two sons and a daughter, all of whom eventually immigrated to the United States:
Raymond Richard Guest (1907–1991), married three times, with five children.
Winston Frederick Churchill Guest (1906–1982), a polo player who married (1) Helena Woolworth McCann (div. 1934), granddaughter of F. W. Woolworth, then (2) Lucy Douglas Cochrane (C. Z. Guest).
He had two sons with Helena Woolworth McCann:
 Winston Alexander Guest Jr.
 Frederick E. Guest II
He had a son and a daughter with Lucille Douglas Cochrane:
 Alexander Michael Douglas Dudley Guest
Cornelia Guest
Diana Guest (1909–1994), married (1) Marc Sevastopoulo, (2) Count Jean de Gaillard de la Valdène (1895–1977), then (3) Allen Manning.
She had two children with Count Jean de Gaillard de la Valdène:
 Guy Winston de Gaillard de la Valdène
 Lorraine Aimee de Gaillard de la Valdène

Family tree

John Guest (1722-1785)
Thomas Guest (d. 1807), ∞ Jemima Revel Phillips
Sir Josiah John Guest, 1st Baronet (1785–1852), ∞ 1817 : Maria Elizabeth Ranken (d. 1818), ∞ 1833 : Lady Charlotte Elizabeth Bertie (1812–1895)
Charlotte Maria Guest (1834–1902), ∞ Richard Du Cane (d. 1904)
Ivor Bertie Guest, 1st Baron Wimborne (1835–1914), ∞ Lady Cornelia Henrietta Maria Spencer-Churchill (1847–1927)
Ivor Churchill Guest, 1st Viscount Wimborne (1873–1939), ∞ 1902 : The Hon. Alice Grosvenor (1880–1948)
Ivor Grosvenor Guest, 2nd Viscount Wimborne (1903–1967), ∞ Lady Mabel Edith Fox-Strangways (b. 1918)
Ivor Fox-Strangways Guest, 3rd Viscount Wimborne (1939–1993), ∞ 1966 : Victoria Ann Vigors, ∞ Venetia Margaret Barker (née Quarry)
Ivor Mervyn Vigors Guest, 4th Viscount Wimborne (b. 1968), ∞ Ieva Imsa
Greta Guest (b. 2011)
Ilona Charlotte Guest (b. 1985), ∞ 2012 : Oliver Hilton-Johnson
Rosemary Guest 
Cynthia Guest
Christian Henry Charles Guest (1874–1957), ∞ The Hon. Frances Lyttelton (1885–1918)
John Guest (1913–1997)
Frederick Edward Guest (1875–1937), ∞ 1905 : Amy Phipps (1873–1959)
Winston Frederick Churchill Guest (1906–1982), ∞ (div.) Helena Woolworth McCann, ∞ Lucy "C. Z." Douglas Cochrane (1920–2003)
Winston Alexander Guest
Frederick E. Guest II (b. 1938)
Alexander Michael Douglas Cochrane Guest (b. 1954)
Cornelia Cochrane Churchill Guest (b. 1963)
Raymond R. Guest (1907–1991), ∞ 1935 : Elizabeth "Lily" Polk, ∞ 1953 : Ellen Tuck French Astor, ∞ Princess Caroline Cecile Alexandrine Jeanne Murat (1923-2012)
Elizabeth Guest (Stevens)
Raymond Richard Guest, Jr. (1939-2001)
Virginia Guest (Valentine)
Achille Murat Guest, ∞ married Judith Wall
Laetitia Amelia Guest (Oppenheim)
Diana Guest Manning (1909–1994), ∞ Marc Sevastopoulo, ∞ Count Jean de Gaillard de la Valdène (1895–1977), ∞ Allen Manning
Guy Winston de Gaillard de la Valdène
Lorraine Aimee de Gaillard de la Valdène
Lionel Guest (1880–1935), ∞ 1905 : Flora Bigelow Dodge
Oscar Montague Guest (1888–1958), ∞ 1924 : Kathleen Susan Paterson (1903–1982)
Bertie Warner Guest (b. 1925), ∞ 1949 : Margaret Rose Henderson
Jonathan Bertie Guest (b. 1952)
Oliver Charles Bertie Guest (b. 1984) ∞ Lisa Ann Vannucci 
 Ivy Willa Charlotte Guest (b. 2019)
Hector Jonathan Guest (b. 1988)
Rose Marie Guest (b. 1990)
Veronica Susan Guest (b. 1953)
Harriet Clare Guest (b. 1955)
Diana Charlotte Guest (b. 1959)
Patrick Henry Guest (b. 1927), ∞ 1951 : Juliet Marian James
Peter Hugh Guest (b. 1952)
Matthew James Guest (b. 1954)
David Christian Guest (b. 1960)
Cornelia Guest (b. 1928), ∞ 1948 : Hugh Dearman Janson, ∞ 1957 : Peter Frederick Arthur Denman (b. 1923)
Francesca Marie-Carola Denman (b. 1959)
Philip Roderick Denman (b. 1961)
Benedict Raphael Denman (b. 1970)
Revel Sarah Guest (b. 1931), ∞ 1963 : Robert Alan Albert
Justin Thomas Albert (b. 1965)
Corisande Charlotte Albert (b. 1967)
Katharine Gwladys Guest (1837–1926), ∞ Reverend Frederick Cecil Alderson (d. 1907)
Thomas Merthyr Guest (1838–1904), ∞ Lady Theodora Grosvenor (1840–1924)
Montague John Guest (1839–1909), never married
Augustus Frederick Guest (1840–1862)
Arthur Edward Guest (1841–1898), ∞ Adeline Mary Chapman (d. 1931)
Mary Enid Evelyn Guest (1843–1912), ∞ Austen Henry Layard (1817–1894)
Constance Rhiannon Guest (1844–1916), ∞ Hon. Charles George Cornwallis Eliot (1839–1901)
Blanche Vere Guest (1847–1919), ∞ Edward Ponsonby, 8th Earl of Bessborough (1851–1920)
Lady Olwen Verene Ponsonby (1876–1927), ∞ Geoffrey Browne, 3rd Baron Oranmore and Browne (1861–1927)
Dominick Browne, 4th Baron Oranmore and Browne (1901–2002), ∞ 1925 (div. 1936) : Mildred Egerton, ∞ 1936 (div. 1950) : Oonagh Guinness, ∞ 1951 : Constance Stevens
Hon. Patricia Helen Browne (b. 1926)
Hon. Brigid Verena Browne (1927–1941)
Dominick Geoffrey Thomas Browne, 5th Baron Oranmore and Browne (b. 1929)
Hon. Martin Michael Dominick Browne (b. 1931)
Shaun Dominick Browne (b. 1964)
Hon. Judith Browne (b. 1934)
Hon. Garech Browne (b. 1939), 1981 : Princess Harshad Purna Devi
Hon. Tara Browne (1945–1966)
Lady Helen Blanche Irene Ponsonby (1878–1962), ∞ John Congreve (1872-1957)
Vere Ponsonby, 9th Earl of Bessborough (1880–1956), ∞ 1952 : Roberte de Neuflize
Frederick Ponsonby, 10th Earl of Bessborough (b. 1913), ∞ Mary Munn (1915–2013)
Lady Charlotte Mary Roberte Paul Ponsonby (b. 1949), ∞ Yanni Petsopoulos
Desmond Ponsonby (1915–1925)
Moyra Blanche Madeleine Ponsonby (b. 1918), ∞ 1945 : Sir Denis Browne (1892–1967)
George Ponsonby(1931–1951)
Hon. Cyril Myles Brabazon (1881–1915), ∞ Rita Narcissa Longfield
Arthur Ponsonby, 11th Earl of Bessborough (1912–2002), ∞ 1952 : Patricia Minnigerode (d. 1952), ∞ 1956 (div. 1963) : Anne Marie Galitzine (née Slatin), ∞ 1963 : Madeleine Lola Margaret Grand
Myles Fitzhugh Longfield Ponsonby, 12th Earl of Bessborough (b. 1941), ∞ 1972 : Alison Marjorie Storey
Hon. Frederick Arthur William Ponsonby (b. 1974), ∞ 2005 : Emily Mott
Hon. Eleanor Grace Ponsonby (b. 2006)
Hon. William Ponsonby (b. 2008)
Lady Chloe Patricia Ponsonby (b. 1975)
Hon. Henry Shakerley Ponsonby (b. 1977)
Lady Sarah Ponsonby (1943–2010)
Hon. Matthew Douglas Longfield Ponsonby (b. 1965), ∞ Jamilie Emett Searle
Hon. Charles Arthur Longfield Ponsonby (b. 1967), ∞ Jennifer Waghorn
Hon. Bertie Brabazon (1885–1967)
Lady Gweneth Frida (1888–1984), ∞ Hon. Windham Baring, ∞ Ralph Cavendish.
Thomas Revel Guest Esq (1790–1837)
Dr Thomas Revel Guest aka Dr Thomas Revel Johnson (1817–1863), ∞ Harriet "Bessie" Jane Willmot
Catharine Anna Johnson, ∞ Dr Alexander Haden (later Alexander Haden-Guest) [a misleading reference]
Sarah Guest aka Sarah Johnson (~1819–?)
Sarah Guest, ∞ Edward Hutchins
Edward John Hutchins (1809–1876), ∞ Isabel Clara de Bernaben
Sarah Guest ∞ William Taitt (d. 1815)

References

Bibliography
Boyce, G. D. (2007) "Guest, Ivor Churchill, first Viscount Wimborne (1873–1939)", Oxford Dictionary of National Biography, Oxford University Press, online edn, accessed 3 September 2007 

John, A. V. (2004) "Guest, Sir (Josiah) John, first baronet (1785–1852)", Oxford Dictionary of National Biography, Oxford University Press, accessed 25 August 2007 

Searle, G. R. (2006) "Guest, Frederick Edward (1875–1937)", Oxford Dictionary of National Biography, Oxford University Press, online edn, accessed 3 September 2007

External links

 
English families
Welsh families
Political families of the United Kingdom